Marpa is a ruined pre-Hispanic town located along the Cotahuasi Canyon in the Andes range of southern Peru.

The Cotahuasi River arises in the Wansu mountain range, cutting a route south-west and ending some 300 km later as the Ocoña River mouthing into the Pacific Ocean. Declared a "Zona Reserva Turistica" in 1988 very little is known about the canyon and Marpa. Rafting expeditions first ran the canyon in 1994. In pre-Hispanic times the Inca road along the canyon was well-used, and sections have survived, as have the ruins of agricultural terraces, staircases and ancient tombs. The Inca road may have been built along the route of an older road built by the Wari culture, a dominant force in the highlands of central and southern Peru between 500AD and 900AD.

External links
Stock Images of Marpa
Rafting the Cotahuasi: One Woman's Whitewater Adventure - Jess Tuerk
Rio Cotahuasi - Robert Bart

References

Archaeological sites in Peru
Ruins in Peru
Archaeological sites in Arequipa Region